McKenzie House may refer to:

in Australia
McKenzie House, Albany, in Albany, Western Australia

in the United States
(by state)
Henry McKenzie House, Prescott, Arkansas, listed on the National Register of Historic Places (NRHP) in Nevada County
McKenzie House (Scott, Arkansas), NRHP-listed in Pulaski County
Mary Phifer McKenzie House, Gainesville, Florida, NRHP-listed
Robert L. McKenzie House, Panama City, Florida, NRHP-listed
David McKenzie Log Cabin, Volga, Kentucky, NRHP-listed
Capers-McKenzie House, Homer, Louisiana, NRHP-listed in Louisiana
John and Harriet McKenzie House, Oswego, New York, NRHP-listed in Oswego County
McKenzie-Cassels House, Groton, South Dakota, NRHP-listed in Brown County, South Dakota
Monroe McKenzie House, Palmyra, Wisconsin, NRHP-listed in Jefferson County